Abberode is a village and a former municipality in the Mansfeld-Südharz district, Saxony-Anhalt, Germany. Since 6 March 2009, it is part of the town Mansfeld.

Former municipalities in Saxony-Anhalt
Mansfeld